Diana Bianchedi (born 4 November 1969) is an Italian former fencer. She won a gold medal in the women's team foil event at the 1992 Summer Olympics and another gold in the same event at the 2000 Summer Olympics.

References

External links
 
 

1969 births
Living people
Italian female fencers
Italian foil fencers
Olympic fencers of Italy
Fencers at the 1992 Summer Olympics
Fencers at the 1996 Summer Olympics
Fencers at the 2000 Summer Olympics
Olympic gold medalists for Italy
Olympic medalists in fencing
Fencers from Milan
Medalists at the 1992 Summer Olympics
Medalists at the 2000 Summer Olympics
Universiade medalists in fencing
Universiade gold medalists for Italy
Medalists at the 1989 Summer Universiade
20th-century Italian women
21st-century Italian women